Lara Dalton (born 23 May 1970) is an Australian politician. She is a Labor member of the Western Australian Legislative Assembly, representing Geraldton since the 2021 state election.

Prior to entering politics, Dalton worked at the Geraldton campus of Central Regional TAFE, operated her own cafe, the Salt Dish Cafe, for five years, and then returned to TAFE as a hospitality lecturer. She was the Labor candidate for Geraldton at the 2017 state election. She was defeated by Ian Blayney, but reduced his margin to just 1.3%, recording a swing of 21.5%. She had actually led the field on the first count, but WA National and One Nation preferences proved too much for her to overcome.

Dalton was elected to the Legislative Assembly on her second attempt at the 2021 election, receiving 61.71% of the two-party preferred vote and comfortably defeating Blayney amidst a statewide Labor landslide. She actually won 54.7 percent of the primary vote, enough to win the seat on the first count. Her victory made her the first woman to represent Geraldton in its 131-year history. Dalton received mentoring during her election campaign from Victorian politician, Candy Broad, through EMILY's List Australia.

References 

Living people
1970 births 
Australian Labor Party members of the Parliament of Western Australia
Members of the Western Australian Legislative Assembly
Women members of the Western Australian Legislative Assembly
21st-century Australian politicians
21st-century Australian women politicians